Variance is an online music and entertainment magazine, co-founded by Jonathan Robles in 2010 and based in Tulsa, Oklahoma. It also publishes a print magazine with past features including The Killers' Brandon Flowers, J. Cole, Ellie Goulding, Robin Thicke, Foster the People, and Ed Sheeran.

Year-End Reviews

Album of the Year

References

External links
 Official website

2010 establishments in Oklahoma
Music magazines published in the United States
Online magazines published in the United States
Magazines established in 2010
Magazines published in Oklahoma
Mass media in Tulsa, Oklahoma